The 2008 Suwon Samsung Bluewings season was Suwon Samsung Bluewings's thirteenth season in the K-League in Republic of Korea. Suwon Samsung Bluewings is competing in K-League, League Cup and Korean FA Cup.

Squad

Backroom Staff

Coaching Staff
Head coach:  Cha Bum-Kun
Assistant coach:  Lee Lim-Saeng 
Coach:  Park Kun-Ha
Reserve Team Coach:  Choi Man-Hee
GK Coach:  Cho Byung-Deuk
Physical trainer:  George Daniel Meyer

Scouter
 Kim Soon-Ki
 Cho Jae-Min

Honours

Club
K-League Winners
K-League Cup Winners

Individual
K-League MVP:  Lee Woon-Jae
K-League Manager of the Year:  Cha Bum-Kun
K-League Best XI:  Lee Woon-Jae,  Mato,  Cho Won-Hee,  Edu

References

External links
 Suwon Bluewings Official website

Suwon Samsung Bluewings seasons
Suwon Samsung Bluewings